Mercedes Raquel Barcha Pardo (November 6, 1932 – August 15, 2020) was the wife of novelist Gabriel García Márquez (1927–2014).

Life 
Barcha was born on November 6, 1932, in Magangué, Colombia. Barcha is best known for her financial and emotional support of her Nobel Prize-winning husband, the author Gabriel García Márquez. She met García Márquez in 1941 when they were both still children, and they married in Barranquilla in 1958. The couple had two children, including director Rodrigo García. 

In 2014, after García Márquez's death, she served as the President Emerita of the Gabriel Garcia Marquez Iberoamerican Foundation for New Journalism in Cartagena, Colombia. In 2017, she founded the Fundación Gabo to promote García Márquez's legacy.

Barcha died in Mexico City on August 15, 2020.

References

1932 births
2020 deaths
Gabriel García Márquez